Bison Peak is the highest summit of the Tarryall Mountains range in the Rocky Mountains of North America. The summit is the highest point in the Lost Creek Wilderness.

Mountain
Bison Peak was so named because rock formations near the summit were said to resemble American bison.

Historical names
Bison Mountain 
Bison Peak

See also

List of Colorado mountain ranges
List of Colorado mountain summits
List of Colorado fourteeners
List of Colorado 4000 meter prominent summits
List of the most prominent summits of Colorado
List of Colorado county high points

References

External links

Mountains of Colorado
Mountains of Park County, Colorado
Pike National Forest
North American 3000 m summits